Alright It Was Frank...And He's Risen From the Dead and Gone Off With His Truck is the first studio album by American country-rock musician Thomas Anderson. It was first released in 1989 on Anderson's own label Out There Records, and was re-released in 1993 by Dutch East India Trading. Its title is taken from a line from the science fiction film It Came from Outer Space.

Commercial impact
After receiving favorable reviews from multiple critics, including Robert Christgau, Alright It Was Frank... found its way to multiple other rock music critics, including Blurts Fred Mills and Jud Cost. According to Anderson himself, a copy of the album also made its way to an independent record store in Germany, which prompted the store's owner to start his own label, Blue Million Miles Records.

Reception

Alright It Was Frank... received favorable reviews from multiple music critics, including Robert Christgau, who gave it an A−. The Washington Posts Geoffrey Himes also reviewed the album favorably, writing that "it takes country-rock from the heartland, speeds it up and crams it full of the twisted commentary only a former rock critic could come up with." John Wooley of Tulsa World also gave the album a favorable review, describing it as "an album   that sizzles with conviction" and "one that seldom lets its substantial intellect get in the way of its emotion."

Track listing

References

1989 debut albums